Foxy Bingo is an English online bingo site that launched in 2005. The brand is owned by Cashcade which is one of the gambling brands owned by GVC Holdings PLC (LSE: GVC), a constituent of the FTSE 250 index.

History 
 Foxy Bingo was founded in 2005 with two bingo and chat rooms by UK]-based online gambling company, Cashcade. In July 2009, Cashcade was bought by PartyGaming.[1] In 2011 PartyGaming merged with bwin Interactive Entertainment AG to form bwin.party Digital Entertainment.
 In September 2015, bwin.party was bought by GVC Holdings. Foxy Bingo’s sister site, Foxy Casino, was also launched in 2015. In 2019 Foxy Casino was relaunched as Foxy Games.

Marketing 
 Celebrities associated with the brand include British television personality Katie Price between 2006 and 2008, and stars of the reality TV show The Only Way is Essex, Joey Essex and Lauren Goodger (with her boyfriend Jake McLean), in 2015.
 The voice of the Foxy Bingo mascot is Adam Catterall.
 The site rebranded in March 2017 using the American actress Heather Graham  as the new face of a £10 million Marketing Campaign.

Sponsorship & partnerships 
Foxy Bingo has had many sponsorship deals such as:
 2011 Foxy Bingo & Smooth Radio – on July 11th, Foxy Bingo sponsored both Smooth Radio’s weekday afternoon show with David Jensen and Real Radio’s evening show with David Heane for 13 weeks
 Foxy Bingo sponsored The Jeremy Kyle Show, a British tabloid talk show presented by Jeremy Kyle for nine years from February 2008 until March 2017.

Charity & community contributions 
 2014 'Think Pink' charity campaign 
 2014 Super League Grand Final 
 2016 Sue Ryder Mascot World Cup

References 

Entain
Bingo